The 1989–90 Murray State Racers men's basketball team represented Murray State University during the 1989–90 NCAA Division I men's basketball season. The Racers, led by head coach Steve Newton, played their home games at Racer Arena in Murray, Kentucky as members of the Ohio Valley Conference. They finished the season 21–9, 10–2 in OVC play to win the OVC regular season championship. They defeated Eastern Kentucky to win the OVC tournament to advance to the NCAA tournament. As No. 16 seed in the Southeast region, the Racers took No. 1 seed Michigan State to overtime before losing 75–71.

Roster

Schedule and results

|-
!colspan=9 style=| Regular season

|-
!colspan=9 style=| Ohio Valley Conference tournament

|-
!colspan=9 style=| NCAA tournament

|-

Awards and honors
Popeye Jones – OVC Player of the Year

References

Murray State Racers men's basketball seasons
Murray State
Murray State
Murray State
Murray State